Hi.5 (Korean: 하이파이브; RR: Haipaibeu; lit. "High Five") is an upcoming South Korean fantasy film written and directed by Kang Hyeong-cheol. Yoo Ah-in, Ra Mi-ran, Ahn Jae-hong, Lee Jae-in, Kim Hee-won, Oh Jung-se and Park Jin-young round out the ensemble cast.

Plot 
Five ordinary people suddenly develop various superpower abilities after receiving organ transplants from a man with psychic superpower. They end up defending themselves from a different group of people who seek to steal their powers.

Cast

Main
 Yoo Ah-in as Ki-dong, an unemployed man who receives a corneal transplant and is able to see electromagnetic waves
 Ra Mi-ran as Sun-nyeo, a yogurt seller
 Ahn Jae-hong as Ji-sung, an aspiring writer who receives a lung transplant and is able to hold his breath for a long time
 Lee Jae-in as Wan-seo, a Taekwondo-loving girl who receives a heart transplant and becomes very strong

Supporting
 Kim Hee-won as Yak-sun, a factory manager and healer
 Oh Jung-se as Wan-seo's father
 Jin Hee-kyung as Choon-hwa
 Shin Goo
 Park Jin-young
 Choi Eun-kyung

Production

Casting 
In March 2021, it was announced that Yoo Ah-in, Ra Mi-ran, Ahn Jae-hong, Oh Jung-se and Lee Jae-in joined the cast of the film, followed by Jinyoung in May 2021.

Filming 
Principal photography began on June 1, 2021. Filming took place in Songdo International Business District, Incheon and Namhyeon-dong, Seoul, and ended on November 7, 2021.

Release
The first tentative date of release for Hi.5 was 2022. It was later scheduled for a May 2023 release, but it was postponed indefinitely after Yoo Ah-in tested positive for propofol and marijuana in February 2023.

References

External links

South Korean fantasy comedy films
Superhero comedy films
Upcoming films